Transporter associated with antigen processing 1 (TAP1) is a protein that in humans is encoded by the TAP1 gene. A member of the ATP-binding cassette transporter family, it is also known as ABCB2.

Function 
The membrane-associated protein encoded by this gene is a member of the superfamily of ATP-binding cassette (ABC) transporters. ABC proteins transport various molecules across extra- and intra-cellular membranes. ABC genes are divided into seven distinct subfamilies (ABC1, MDR/TAP, MRP, ALD, OABP, GCN20, White). This protein is a member of the MDR/TAP subfamily. Members of the MDR/TAP subfamily are involved in multidrug resistance. The protein encoded by this gene is involved in the pumping of degraded cytosolic peptides across the endoplasmic reticulum into the membrane-bound compartment where class I molecules assemble. Mutations in this gene may be associated with ankylosing spondylitis, insulin-dependent diabetes mellitus, and celiac disease.

See also 
 ATP-binding cassette transporter

Interactions 
TAP1 has been shown to interact with:
 HLA-A, and
 Tapasin.

References

Further reading

External links 
 

ATP-binding cassette transporters